Stabburet is a Norwegian food producer founded by Gunnar Nilsen in 1943. Stabburet is a part of Orkla Foods, and has ten factories in southern Norway. It sells well-known brands, such as Grandiosa, Big One, Nugatti, Fun Light, Idun and Chef.

References 
 Stabburet website (Norwegian).

Food and drink companies of Norway
Orkla ASA